Garnwerd is a wierde village next to the Reitdiep in the municipality of Westerkwartier in the Dutch province of Groningen.

History 
The village was first mentioned in the 10th or 11th century as "ad Granauurð". The etymology is unclear. Garnwerd is a elongated terp (artificial living hill) village which developed in the Middle Ages. The village flourished due to the trade from Groningen to the former Lauwerszee.

The choir of the Dutch Reformed church dates from 1229. In 1738, the tower collapsed and was rebuilt in 1751. The grist mill De Meeuw dates from 1851, and is occasionally used to grind grain.

Garnwerd was home to 465 people in 1840. Garnwerd was part of the municipality of Ezinge. In 1990, it became part of Winsum. In 2019, it became part of the municipality of Westerkwartier

Gallery

References

External links 
 

Populated places in Groningen (province)
Westerkwartier (municipality)